The Good for Nothing is a 1917 American silent drama film directed by Carlyle Blackwell and starring Blackwell, Evelyn Greeley and Kate Lester.

Cast
 Carlyle Blackwell as Jack Burkshaw 
 Evelyn Greeley as Marion Alston 
 Kate Lester as Mrs. Burkshaw 
 Charles Duncan as Eugene Alston 
 William Sherwood as Jerry Alston 
 Muriel Ostriche as Barbara Manning 
 Eugenie Woodward as Barbara's Mother 
 Katherine Johnston as Laurel Baxter 
 Pinna Nesbit as Clarice Laverne

References

Bibliography
 Robert Connelly. Motion Picture Guide Silent Film 1910-1936. Cinebooks, 1988.

External links
 

1917 films
1917 drama films
1910s English-language films
American silent feature films
Silent American drama films
Films directed by Carlyle Blackwell
American black-and-white films
World Film Company films
1910s American films